Pavel Kovalev may refer to:

 Pavel "Pasha" Kovalev (born 1980), Russian professional Latin & ballroom dancer
 Pavel Kovalev (figure skater) (born 1992), Russian-French pair skater